Li Ning (born November 12, 1994) is a Chinese baseball catcher who plays with the Shanghai Golden Eagles in the China Baseball League.

Career
Li represented China at the 2015 Asian Baseball Championship, 2017 World Baseball Classic and 2018 Asian Games.

References

1994 births
Living people
Asian Games competitors for China
Baseball catchers
Baseball players at the 2018 Asian Games
Chinese expatriate baseball players in the United States
Shanghai Golden Eagles players
Texas AirHogs players
2017 World Baseball Classic players
2023 World Baseball Classic players